Mường Phăng is a commune (xã) and village of the Điện Biên District of Điện Biên Province, northwestern Vietnam. It is located northeast of the city of Dien Bien Phu and contains the historical relic site of the Dien Bien Phu Campaign Headquarters.

References

Communes of Điện Biên province
Populated places in Điện Biên province